The Meadly House is a historic building located in the West End of Davenport, Iowa, United States. The Second Empire structure was built in 1881 for the Meadly family. Elizabeth Meadly was listed the longest at this residence. Four other people, possibly boarders or renters, were listed at this address by 1900. This house, and the nearby Albert Kiene House, are unique in that they are single story, brick residences with a high pitched Mansard roof that features prominent gabled dormers. The roughly cross-shaped house also has a small Mansard superimposed on the projecting pavilion, and a porch in the northeast reentrant angle. It originally had Eastlake details. The house has been listed on the National Register of Historic Places since 1984.

References

Houses completed in 1881
Second Empire architecture in Iowa
Houses in Davenport, Iowa
Houses on the National Register of Historic Places in Iowa
National Register of Historic Places in Davenport, Iowa
1881 establishments in Iowa